Robert Lansing (1864–1928) was a U.S. Secretary of State

Robert Lansing may also refer to:
Robert Lansing (actor) (1928–1994), American actor
Robert Lansing (state senator) (1799–1878), New York politician